Charalambous is a Cypriot surname. Notable people include:

Andrew Charalambous, British businessman
Angelis Charalambous (born 1989), Cypriot footballer
Bambos Charalambous (born 1967), British Labour Party politician
Elias Charalambous (born 1980), Cypriot footballer
Marios Charalambous (born 1969), Cypriot footballer
Michalis Charalambous (born 1999), Cypriot footballer
Zacharias Charalambous (born 1971), Cypriot footballer

See Also
Charalambos (given name)